Nathalie Marie-Nely (born 24 November 1986 at Lamentin) is a French athlete, who specializes in the  triple jump.

Biography  
Nathalie was Junior Champion of France in the  triple jump in 2004 and 2005 and Under 21s champion of France in 2006. She won the elite Triple Jump National titles in 2011 and 2014. She also won two National titles Indoors, in 2012 and 2013.

Her personal record, set on 5 June 2012 at Montreuil-sous-Bois, is 14.03 m.

Prize list  
 French Championships in Athletics   :  
 winner of the triple jump 2011 and 2014   
 French Indoor Athletics Championships:  
 winner of the triple jump 2012 and 2013

Records

Notes and references

External links  
 

1986 births
Living people
French female triple jumpers